Syedna Ali Shamsuddin bin Maulaya Hasan  was the 30th Dai of the Dawoodi Bohras (died 25 Rabi-ul-akhir 1042 AH or 1634 AD, Yemen). He succeeded the 29th Dai Syedna Abduttayyeb Zakiuddin to the religious post. Syedna Shamsuddin became Da'i al-Mutlaq in 1041 AH (1633 AD). His period of Dawat was 1041–1042 AH (1633–1634 AD).

Family
Syedna Ali Shamsuddin was the son of Syedi Hasan bin Idris. Syedna Ali's mother was Na'ama baisaheba, daughter of Syedi Hasan bin Nooh Bharuchi. Syedna Ali resided in Yemen and led da'wat from there.

Life
He was the 18th and final dai from the lineage of Banu al-Walid al-Anf. He endeavored to guide towards righteousness. He is buried in Hisn-e-Af'eda, Yemen.

Succession
Syedna Ali Shamsuddin appointed Syedna Qasim Khan Zainuddin as the next Da'i.

References

Further reading
The Ismaili, their history and doctrine by Farhad Daftary (Chapter - Mustalian Ismailism-p. 300-310)

Dawoodi Bohra da'is
Year of birth unknown
1634 deaths
Banu al-Walid al-Anf
Tayyibi da'is
17th-century Ismailis